Dankert is a surname. Notable people with the surname include:

 Bastian Dankert (born 1980), German football referee
 Billy Dankert, American musician
 Piet Dankert (1934–2003), Dutch politician

See also
 Danckert